KK Radoviš is a basketball club based in Radoviš, North Macedonia. They currently play in the Macedonian Third League.

Squad 2016/2017

References

External links
 

Basketball teams in North Macedonia